Dungeons & Dragons is an American animated television series based on TSR's Dungeons & Dragons role-playing game. It is a co-production of Marvel Productions and TSR, with the Japanese Toei Animation. It ran on CBS from 1983 through 1985 for three seasons, for a total of twenty-seven episodes.

The show focuses on a group of six friends who are transported into the realm of Dungeons & Dragons, following their adventures as they try to find a way home with the help of their guide the Dungeon Master while combating an evil wizard. 

A final unproduced episode would have served as both a conclusion to the story and as a re-imagining of the show, had it been picked up for a fourth season. However, it was canceled before the episode was made. The script has since been published online and was performed as an audio drama as a special feature for the BCI Eclipse DVD edition of the series.

Overview
The show focuses on a group of friends aged between 9 and 15 who are transported to the realm of Dungeons & Dragons by taking a magical dark ride on an amusement park roller coaster. Upon arriving in the realm they meet Dungeon Master (named for the referee in the role-playing game) who gives each child a magical item.

The children's main goal is to find a way home, but they often take detours to help people or find that their fates are intertwined with that of others. The group comes across many different enemies, but their primary antagonist is Venger. He is a powerful wizard who wishes to rule the realm and believes the power from the children's weapons will help him to do so. Another recurring villain is Tiamat, who is a five-headed dragon and the only creature that Venger fears.

Throughout the series, a connection is suggested between Dungeon Master and Venger. At the end of the episode "The Dragon's Graveyard", Dungeon Master calls Venger "my son". The final unproduced episode "Requiem" would have confirmed that Venger is the Dungeon Master's corrupted son (making Kareena the sister of Venger and the daughter of Dungeon Master), redeemed Venger (giving those trapped in this realm their freedom), and ended on a cliffhanger where the six children could finally return home or deal with evil that still existed in the realm.

Characters

Heroes

 Hank, the Ranger (voiced by Willie Aames): At 15 years of age, he is the leader of the group. Hank is brave and noble, maintaining a focus and determination even when presented with grave danger. Hank is a Ranger, with the magical Energy Bow that shoots arrows of glowing energy. These arrows can be used in many different ways such as a climbing tool, to hurt enemies, to bind them, to create light, or to form temporary makeshift cages.
 Eric, the Cavalier (voiced by Don Most): The Cavalier, age 15, is the spoiled child, originating from a rich home. On the surface, Eric is a big-mouthed comic relief coward. Eric has a heroic core, and frequently saves his friends from danger with his magical Griffon Shield, which can project a force field. Despite his aloofness and several instances of selfishness, Eric shares the common camaraderie of the group, and occasionally steps to the fore as a substitute leader in Hank's absence.
 Diana, the Acrobat (voiced by Tonia Gayle Smith): Diana is a brave, athletic, and outspoken 14-year-old girl. She is an Acrobat who carries the Javelin Staff, which can shift in length from as short as a few inches (and thus easily carried on her person) to as long as six feet, along with the ability to be easily reconnectable when broken. Diana is also known to provide inspiration, guidance and support for her friends at times of peril or worry.
 Presto, the Magician (voiced by Adam Rich): The 14-year-old Wizard of the team. Friendly and fiercely loyal to all in the group, Presto fulfills the role of the well-meaning, diligent magic user whose spells frequently—though not always—either fail or produce unintended results.
 Sheila, the Thief (voiced by Katie Leigh): As the Thief, Sheila, aged 13, has the Cloak of Invisibility which makes her invisible when the hood is raised over her head. Although occasionally emotionally vulnerable and with a great fear of being alone in the realm, Sheila regularly utilizes the stealth attributes of her cloak at great peril to herself for the benefit of the common goals of her group.
 Bobby, the Barbarian (voiced by Ted Field III): Bobby is the youngest member of the team at nine years old and the younger brother of Sheila. He is the Barbarian, as indicated by his fur pants and boots, horned helmet, and cross belt harness. Brash, brave and selfless but occasionally impulsive, Bobby's personality frequently puts himself and his friends in danger. His weapon saves the protagonists from peril on numerous occasions.
 Uni, the Unicorn (vocal effects provided by Frank Welker): Uni is Bobby's pet, a baby unicorn. Markedly timid, Uni is closest to Bobby.
 Dungeon Master (voiced by Sidney Miller): The group's friend and mentor, he provides important advice and help, but often in a cryptic manner that does not make sense until the team has completed the quest of each episode. He supplies the companions with their weapons and clues for their numerous opportunities to return home.

Villains

 Venger, the Force of Evil (voiced by Peter Cullen): The main antagonist and the Dungeon Master's son (as revealed in "The Dragon's Graveyard" when Dungeon Master refers to him as "my son"), Venger is an evil wizard of great power who seeks to use the children's magical weapons to bolster his power.
 Shadow Demon (voiced by Bob Holt): A shadowy demon, he is Venger's personal spy and personal assistant. Shadow Demon often informs Venger about the children's current quests and often refers to them as "Dungeon Master's young ones".
 Night-Mare: A black horse that serves as Venger's mode of transportation.
 Tiamat (vocal effects provided by Frank Welker): Venger's arch-rival is a fearsome female five-headed dragon with a reverberating multi-level voice. Her five heads are a white head breathing ice, a green head breathing toxic gas, a central red head breathing fire, a blue head breathing lightning, and a black head breathing acid. Tiamat is known to be the sole creature Venger fears within the realm.
 Kareena (voiced by Diane Pershing): The sister of Venger and his rival in conquering the realm the protagonists inhabit. Kareena first appears in the episode Citadel of Shadow when she encounters Sheila as she herself is confined within a force field imposed by Venger. Sheila's altruism within this episode unleashes humanity within Kareena. The unmade final episode to the series, Requiem, was planned to confirm that Kareena was also Dungeon Master's daughter.

Episodes

Season 1 (1983)

Season 2 (1984)

Season 3 (1985)

Unfinished finale
The intended final episode from the third season, and potential series finale, entitled "Requiem", was written by the series' frequent screenwriter Michael Reaves, but was not finished due to the show's cancellation. It would have served as both a conclusion to the current story as well as a re-imagining of the series had the show continued into a fourth season. Reaves has discussed the episode online, and published the original script on his personal website. The BCI Eclipse Region 1 DVD release includes the script recorded in the form of an audio drama as a special feature.

A fan-made animated version of the finale appeared online in 2020. It includes the original audio drama, with animations mostly recut from the series. It stars Wally Wingert as Dungeon Master and Hank, Daniel Roebuck as Eric, Jarrod Nead as Presto, Neil Kaplan as Venger, and Ryan Nead as Redeemed Venger, with Katie Leigh and Frank Welker reprising their roles as Shiela and Uni, and Katie Leigh voices Bobby.

Cast
 Katie Leigh - Sheila the Thief
 Frank Welker - Uni, Tiamat, Sir John, Fairy, Jimmy's Dad, Pilot, Fairie Dragon, Additional voices
 Willie Aames - Hank the Ranger
 Don Most - Eric the Cavalier
 Adam Rich - Presto the Magician
 Peter Cullen - Venger, The Darkling, Additional voices
 Teddy Field III - Bobby the Barbarian
 Sidney Miller - Dungeon Master
 Tonia Gayle Smith - Diana the Acrobat
 Bob Holt - Shadow Demon

Additional voices
 Laurie O'Brien
 Jennifer Darling
 Gary Goren
 Georgi Irene 
 Maia Mattisse	 
 Diane Pershing - Kareena
 Hank Saroyan
 Russi Taylor - Amber the Fairie Dragon

Reception
The level of violence was controversial for American children's television at the time, and the script of one episode, "The Dragon's Graveyard", was almost canceled because the characters contemplated killing their nemesis, Venger. In 1985, the National Coalition on Television Violence demanded that the FTC run a warning during each broadcast stating that Dungeons & Dragons had been linked to real-life violent deaths. The series spawned more than 100 different licenses, and the show led its time slot for two years.

Awards
For her work on the series, Tonia Gayle Smith (as "Diana") was nominated for Outstanding Young Actress in an Animation Voice-over at the 1984–1985 Youth in Film Awards. In January 2009, IGN ranked Dungeons & Dragons at #64 on its "Best 100 Animated Series" list.

Home media
In 2004, Contender Entertainment Group released the series on four stand-alone DVDs (under license from Fox Kids Europe/Jetix Europe). Extra features on each volume include fan commentary tracks on two episodes, character profiles, and DVD-ROM content. The original series bible, scripts, character model sheets, original promo artwork, an interview with Michael Reaves (writer on the unproduced finale episode "Requiem"), and a featurette on the title sequence are spread amongst the discs. The fourth volume includes the script for "Requiem" and a featurette about it. The four DVDs each have different original cover artwork (by Eamon O'Donoghue) that form a panorama when placed side by side, depicting the series' main characters: Hank and Sheila with Venger, Presto with Tiamat, Eric and Diana with Shadow Demon, and Bobby with Uni and Dungeon Master.

The first Region 1 DVD release, Dungeons & Dragons - The Complete Animated Series, was released on December 5, 2006, by BCI Eclipse LLC, under its Ink & Paint classic animation entertainment brand (under license from Disney). The 5-disc set featured all 27 episodes, uncut, digitally re-mastered, and presented in story continuity order, as well as an extensive array of special features including documentaries, commentaries, character profiles, a radio play of the unproduced finale episode "Requiem", and more. This release is now out of print, as BCI Eclipse ceased operations in December 2008.

In 2009, Mill Creek Entertainment released the complete series on August 25 (once again under license from Disney), in a 3-disc set without any special features, but with almost all the original music restored; the release contains all the televised episodes but does not contain the radio play of "Requiem".

The series was on Toon Disney's Jetix block during 2006, 2007, and 2008.

The complete series was streamed on Twitch on July 9, 2021, as part of the Saturday Morning D&D Secret Lair, which is a limited edition of Magic the Gathering cards showcasing characters from the cartoon, later released on October 29 the same year.

Merchandise and other media

The show produced a variety of spin-off merchandise.

Board games
In 1984 TSR, Inc. released the board game named Quest for the Dungeonmaster, inspired by the episode "In Search of the Dungeon Master", in which Dungeon Master is captured by Warduke and frozen in a magic crystal, and the kids try to rescue him before Venger gets there. Brazilian company Grow released a Portuguese-language version of this game in 1993.

Books
Several books based on this series were released at the time of its highest popularity:

 Pick a Path to Adventure books: Six gamebooks written from the point of view of one of the children, each focused on a different character (though Eric's book gave the protagonism to his younger brother Michael, who did not appear in the cartoon series). These books were released by TSR.
 UK Annuals: Two hardcover books published in the United Kingdom in 1985 and 1987 by World International Publishing Limited, each including various prose stories. The first featured seven original adventures, while the second only included three, plus Comics Forum's adaptation of "The Eye of the Beholder" (translated as "The Eye of the Watchman!").
 Donjons et Dragons: Published in France, a six-book collection adapting different episodes in storybook form.

Card games
In 2021, Wizards of the Coast released a "Secret Lair set" for Magic the Gathering based on the animated series.

Comic books 
 Dragones y Mazmorras are comic book adaptations of all 27 episodes by Comics Forum, a division of Spanish publisher Editorial Planeta De Agostini under license from TSR.
 Marvel Summer Special 1987: Published in the United Kingdom, it is an English-language reprint of Comics Forum's adaptation of the episode "Prison Without Walls".
 Forgotten Realms: The Grand Tour: One-shot comic book published by TSR in 1996. It features the now-adult protagonists still living in a Dungeons & Dragons world, this time the Forgotten Realms, with Presto seeking an apprenticeship with Elminster the Sage.
A miniseries based on the show, Saturday Morning Adventures, written by David M. Booher and Sam Maggs, with artwork by George Kambadais, is scheduled for release in March 2023 by IDW Publishing.

Music
A full orchestral version of the Dungeons & Dragons animated series main theme, composed by Johnny Douglas, was released as the sixth track of the 1991 album The Johnny Douglas Strings - On Screen, published by the label Dulcima, a record label founded by Douglas in 1983.

Television advertisements
The characters were licensed for a Brazilian live-action television advertisement, released in May 2019 to promote the launch of Renault's Kwid Outsider. It was shot in Salta, in Argentina, near the Andes mountain range.

Toys and collectibles
An Advanced Dungeons & Dragons toy line was produced by LJN in 1983, including original characters such as Warduke, Strongheart the Paladin, and the evil Wizard Kelek, who would later appear in campaigns for the Basic Set of the roleplaying game. None of the main characters from the TV series are in the toy line, but Warduke, Strongheart, and Kelek each appear in one episode of the series. Only in Spain and Portugal were PVC figures of the main characters produced. The Brazilian company Iron Studios released in 2019 an entire set of polystone collectible statues for most of the Dungeons & Dragons cartoon characters, using a 1/10 scale and forming a full diorama. The same year, PCS Collectibles released two versions of Venger in 1:4 scale, both fully sculpted and hand painted polystone statues. In 2022, Hasbro launched the Cartoon Classics action figurine series based on Dungeons & Dragons.

References

External links

 
 
 Model sheets for characters

1980s American animated television series
1983 American television series debuts
1985 American television series endings
American children's animated action television series
American children's animated adventure television series
American children's animated fantasy television series
CBS original programming
English-language television shows
Television series about being lost from home
Television series by Marvel Productions
Television shows based on role-playing games
Works based on Dungeons & Dragons